The Ven.  Lancelot Farquharson Addison  was an Anglican priest: Archdeacon of Dorset from 1948  to 1955.

He was educated at Leeds Grammar School. After a year of studying at University College, Durham, Addison continued his education at Lichfield Theological College. He was ordained in 1911. Following  curacies in Stafford, King's Cross  and Brighouse he was Vicar of St Thomas, Halifax and then Cranborne before his  Archdeacon’s appointment. He was appointed Treasurer of Salisbury Cathedral shortly before his death in November 1955, aged 69.

References
 

People educated at Leeds Grammar School
Alumni of University College, Durham
Archdeacons of Dorset